Bounty (popularly HMAV Bounty) was built in 1977/78 for the movie The Bounty starring Mel Gibson and Anthony Hopkins. The ship launched on 16 December 1978 and was decommissioned in 2017.

Design and construction
For the filming of The Bounty, a replica of William Bligh's ship,  was required. The Bounty replica was built by Whangarei Engineering Company at Whangarei, New Zealand during 1978 and 1979. The ship was designed to externally conform to the original Bounty.

To reflect the international legacy of the Mutiny on the Bounty, materials for the ship were sourced from across the British Commonwealth. The hull was fabricated from Australian steel, which was carvel-clad in New Zealand iroko. The decking is New Zealand tanekaha. The masts and spars were made of Canadian pine, with sails made from Scottish flax, and blocks of English ash and elm. The sail plan was of a barque: some sources describe the layout as a full-rigged ship, but the ship lacks a topgallant on the mizzen-mast.

History
The film The Bounty was completed and released in 1984. Bounty was laid up in Los Angeles until 1986, when Bounty Voyages purchased the ship. She was sailed to Vancouver, refitted, then sailed to Australia. From here, she proceeded to England via the Suez Canal to join the First Fleet Re-enactment Voyage: a historical re-enactment for the Australian Bicentenary. She left England for Australia in May 1987, and sailed with the fleet via Tenerife, Rio de Janeiro, Cape Town, Mauritius, and Fremantle before arriving in Sydney on Australia Day (26 January) 1988.

For many years she served the tourist excursion market from Circular Quay, Sydney, Australia, before being sold to real estate conglomerate HKR International Limited in October 2007.

The company gave The Bounty an additional name in Chinese,   (Cantonese Jyutping: Zaimanhou ; Mandarin Pinyin: Jiminhao ; English: Bounty) after company founder Cha Chi Ming.
For the following decade, the ship was used as a tourist attraction in Discovery Bay, on Lantau Island in Hong Kong, where it was used  for harbour cruises, charters, day excursions, weddings and corporate retreats
. 
With no publicity or explanation, HKRI decommissioned The Bounty on 1 August 2017. And the company did not disclose the ship's fate.

But the ship has been spotted in Phra Samut Chedi, at the mouth of the Chao Phraya River in Thailand. It was rechristened The Bounty (เดอะ บาวน์ตี้).

Google shows the ship clearly both aerially (dated 2022) and from 'Street View' (dated Oct 2020) from boats travelling up the Chao Phraya River.

See also
 
 , replica built in Canada in 1960 for the 1962 MGM film Mutiny on the Bounty.

Footnotes

Citations

References

External links 

 

1978 ships
HMS Bounty
Individual sailing vessels
Replica ships